Epe is a town and Local Government Area (LGA)
in Lagos State, Nigeria located on the north side of the Lekki Lagoon and about 90 km from Ibadan. During the 2006 Census, the population of Epe was approximately 181,409.

There is no paramount ruler in the area as there are two major communities with individual monarchs. These are the Eko Epe and Ijebu Epe communities within the same town.The notable festivals that are mostly celebrated in Epe land include Kayo-kayo Festival, Ebi day, Ojude-Oba, and Epe day.

A road junction at the entrance into Epe from the Lekki-Epe Expressway features a sculpture of two giant fish, erected by the Lagos State Government.

Notable higher institutions like Lagos State University(LASU), Yaba College of Technology, Lagos State University of Education(LASUED) (Formerly known as Michael Otedola College of Primary Education - MOCPED)., Pan-Atlantic University(PAU), St. Augustine university, all have campuses in Epe area of Lagos, Nigeria.

History 
In years past, before this settlement came to be called Epe, the town had earlier been known as Igbo Obo (Forest of Monkeys). Some group of hunters from Ijebu, were led by one Urankaloye or Uraka had visited this part of the world during a hunting expedition in search for animals. Though it later served as the refuge for the forces of Kosoko, the Yoruba king ousted from Lagos by the British in 1851. In 1892, Epe was the embarkation point for the military expedition sent by Sir Gilbert Carter, the then Governor of Lagos, to defeat the awujale (the Ijebu political and spiritual ruler) at Ijebu-Ode. Uraka and Aramope which were both hunters then left Ile-Ife on a hunting expedition arriving in Ijebu-Ode, Uraka never knew that he was on a threshold of history.

When Uraka got to Ijebu-Ode, he got a message through an Ifa divination. He was told to move southwards towards the sea and should settle anywhere between his crossing of the sixth and seventh river. After crossing the fifth river called "OTERIN" (Cold Water), he got to a place later identified as ‘Poka’ where he used his popoka stick to strike the ground. Poka town was derived from his name called Uraka's popoka stick. At Poka, the Ifa oracle was further consulted for direction which led Uraka to proceed and after crossing the sixth river, he finally settled in a place called "ETITA".

Upon settling at Etita, Uraka saw a smoke emanating from a heavily thick forest towards the lagoon. To see things for himself, Uraka traced the source of the smoke where he met some fishermen named Opute, Lugbasa, Alaro and Ogunmodede. Alaro and Ogunmodede were married but childless. Both later became deities and are worshipped in Epe till date, hence all Epe's sons and daughters are referred to as "Omo Epe Alaro Ogunmodede".

Meanwhile Uraka continued his hunting expeditions until he got to a place called Igbo obo (monkey forest), the present site of the Lagos State University, School of Engineering and formerly a military barracks, from where he continued his search for games. He later discovered a place called Oko-Eepe (Forest of black ants). As it turned out, whenever Uraka set his traps for games, he always returned home empty handed. This became a source of worry to him and his wife. Yet he was convinced that Oko-Eepe was home to the biggest games around. He complained to his wife named "PEETA" that the forest was infested with black ants and whenever he tapped his feet to ward off the black ants, animals around would take to their heels. More so, any animal caught by his traps were always eaten up by the ants before he got there.

Each time Uraka sets out for hunting, Peeta would ask if he was still going to Oko-Eepe. Eepe town derived its name from Oko-Eepe in the 15th century and some historians believed Peeta, Uraka's wife, must have played a vital role in the naming of Epe Town. Epe started expanding and in no time, some people settled at Areke or Aleke while others settled at the other side known as "Apakeji". Along the line, an Ijebu prince, son of the fifth Awujale of Ijebu-Ode, Obaloja left Ijebu-Ode and settled in Epe. He took the name Oloja and by 1790, Shagbafara was installed Oloja. As at 1810, Epe was fairly a large town. The town was relatively peaceful but had its own share of inter-tribal war. However, 1848 witnessed the Makun-Omi-Epe war. It was almost immediately after the end of Makun-Omi-Epe war that King Kosoko of Lagos sought refuge in Epe Land with over 1,500 followers. That was in December 1851, during the reign of Oloja Olumade.

Kosoko was denied entry into Epe town but after a long plea, he was directed to Ijebu-Ode to obtain clearance and permission from Awujale Anikilaya. The Awujale consequently considered him as a mark of royalty and sent "Oja Ikale" as symbol of permission and caring to Oloja Olumade, asking him to grant Kosoko and his lieutenants’ asylum in Epe. Kosoko's stay in Epe was a subject of controversy.  Some claimed that in his 11 years in Epe, he never had a house of his own, while others think otherwise. But whatever the case might have been, Kosoko's years in Epe changed the socio-cultural atmosphere of Epe town, because some of his followers to Epe town were mostly Muslims.

Balogun Ajeniya, Oshodi Tapa, Balogun Agbaje, Disu Kujeniya, Braimoh Iyanda Oloko and Posu were some of the brave warriors who were in Epe with Kosoko. Some of these chiefs converted to Islam. For example, Balogun Ajeniya, who later became a great promoter of Islam in Epe was one of them. These converts later formed a community under the leadership of Mallam Idris Saliu Gana, who happened to be an Imam in Lagos. This was responsible for the spread of Islam in Epe town to date. The term "Epe Onikurani" was as a result of the spread of Islam in Epe. In appreciation for the treatment accorded to him in Epe, Kosoko gave one of his daughters named Kusade to an Ijebu Chief, Adebawon of Idogun in marriage; Adenusi was the product of that marriage.

In 1869, Kosoko was pardoned and later returned to Lagos. The bulk of his followers left with him, including his daughter Kusade, and leaving behind his grandson Adenusi. Adenusi's family is still multiplying in Epe to date. Those left behind by Kosoko formed bulk of what is now referred to as Epe Eko. In 1892, Epe was the embarkation point for the military expedition sent by Sir Gilbert Carter, the governor of Lagos, to defeat the awujale (the Ijebu political and spiritual ruler) at Ijebu-Ode.

Modern Epe is a collecting point for the export of fish, cassava (manioc), corn (maize), green vegetables, coconuts, cocoa, palm produce, rubber, and firewood to Lagos. Special leaves useful in preserving kola nuts are trucked to Ijebu-Ode, Shagamu, and the other main kola-shipping towns. Epe is best known for its construction of the motorized, shallow-draft barges that navigate the coastal lagoons. Fishing is the major occupation. The town is served by secondary schools, several hospitals, and a health office. They are popularly known for fishing.

Epe to this day is a predominantly a Muslim town.

Notable indigenes
Femi Otedola
Akinwunmi Ambode
Shafi Edu
Michael Otedola
Dapo Sarumi
John Obafunwa
Honourable Stephen Adedapo Banjo

Tourist centers and monuments 

 Agricultural Training Institute, Araga, Epe.
 Centre for Rural Development's [CERUD] Complex and Botanical Garden, Igbodu, Epe.
 Eko Tourist Beach Resort, Akodo, Ibeju-Lekki.
 Lagos State University [LASU], Epe Campus.
 Lekki Free Trade Zone Complex.
 Yaba College of Technology (YABATECH), Epe Campus.
 Lekki Rest House: Confinement Home of Nigeria's first Opposition Leader.
 Murtala Mohammed Botanical Garden, Epe.
 Recreation Centre, Epe, Marina.
 Relics of Brazilian Architecture and Atlantic Slave Trade, Lekki Town.
 Youth Rehabilitation and Development Centre, Ita-Oko Island, Epe.

Gallery

Timeline 

AD 1780: Oloja Shagbafara installed Oloja of Epe.

1810: Epe became a fairly large town.

1836: Awujale Figbajoye Anikilaya established Ejirin market.

1848: Makum Omi-Epe war

1851: King Kosoko sought refuge in Epe

1852: Islam was introduced by followers of Kosoko in Epe.

1854: Kosoko and his chiefs signed a treaty of peace with Mr. B. Campbell, British Counsel not to regain Lagos in return to have palma and Lekki as his port.

1862: British negotiated with Kosoko and obtained from him cessions of Palma and Lekki. Koso, Oshodi Tapa and others left Epe and returned to Lagos on 16 September 1862.

1863: Governor Freeman twice attacked Epe with a force of West Indian Regiment, Hausas and British sailors, Chief Posu Submitted and signed a treaty of cession on 26 March.

1875: Posu, a leading figure among followers of Kosoko to prove his mantle and ceded Epe to the British died in Epe on 14 December 1875.

On 29 December 1882: Awujale Fidipote left Ijebu-Ode in anger unexpectedly to settle at Epe where he remained till his death on 14 June 1885.

On 15 August 1885: Asani Giwa of Okepopo was killed by the Eko Epes at Ikosi Market.

1886: Some Ijebus who came with Awujale Fidipote to Epe killed Agurin, the guard in charge of Ejirin market.

1888: Balogun Agoro of Epe drowned via Lekki

1892: British Expedition to Ijebu-Ode landed in Epe base of operation. Inspector A. cloud Willoughby was shot dead at Odo-Ragunsen.

18 May 1892: Christianity was established in Epe

1894: St. Michael's C.M.S School was established.

1898: Baale Buraimoh Edu, veteran politician sponsored and finance the course of Muslim Education in Epe.

1898: Government Muslim school was opened

1901: Chief Imam Uthman died on 22 January and Epe Town Council was established

1903: Paul Ogunsanya and others brought Roman Catholic Mission to Ibonwon

1905: Misunderstanding between Ijebu-Epe and Eko Epe became much more acute as a result of Ijaw fishermen, fishing on the lagoon.

1912: War broke out between Ijebu Epe and Eko Epe

1917: 9 July, Baale Buraimoh Edu died

1923: S.A Mejindade Esq opened the Islamic school which became Ansa-ud-deen school in 1946

In March 1930: Daddy Solomon Ademuwagun introduced Cherubim and Seraphim in Epe.

1937: Commissioner of Colony (Captain Emberton) the District Officer (Mr. Childs) Assistant District Officer (Mr. Gilbons) had an important meeting with Baale Abidakun and Kaka, Balogun Abudu Kadiri Oluwo and Amunikaro Mr. T.O. Seriki and A.B. Egberongbe, all of Ijebu Epe and Eko-Epe on the way and means to engender harmony and mutual dealing towards the re-organization to native administration.

1937, 14–15 September: Commissioner of colony, district officers, bales and Baloguns of Ijebu and Eko Epe had important meetings with the baales of adjourning villages to convey to them the decision taken at the meeting on the 28 of August and to sought their opinions on the proposals set up for the formation of a native administration in District.

References

External links

 Epe Local Government

Local Government Areas in Lagos State
Populated coastal places in Nigeria
Local Government Areas in Yorubaland